|}
Roger William Stanley Vale (28 June 1942 – 10 April 2001) was an Australian politician. He was a Country Liberal Party member of the Northern Territory Legislative Assembly from 1974 to 1994, representing Stuart from until 1983 and Braitling thereafter. His father, Monte Vale, was a member of the Victorian Legislative Assembly.

References

1942 births
2001 deaths
Members of the Northern Territory Legislative Assembly
Country Liberal Party members of the Northern Territory Legislative Assembly
Speakers of the Northern Territory Legislative Assembly
20th-century Australian politicians